Ayvadüzü is a village in the Adaklı District, Bingöl Province, Turkey. The village is populated by Kurds of the Oxçiyan tribe and had a population of 193 in 2021.

The hamlets of Çakıl, Dağdelen, Gözüpek and Yarımca are attached to the village.

References 

Villages in Adaklı District
Kurdish settlements in Bingöl Province